During World War II, the Luftwaffe (German air force) equipped their aircraft with the most modern weaponry available until resources grew scarce later in the war.

Machine guns
(Maschinengewehr)
 MG 15
 MG 17
 MG 81 & 81Z
 MG 131

Autocannon 
(Maschinenkanone and related types)

 MG FF and FF/M [1]
 MG 151, /15 or /20 [1]
 MK 101
 MK 103
 MK 108

[1] The official designation for MG FF and MG 151 was Maschinengewehr but they are cannon.

Heavy aircraft cannon
(Bordkanone)
 BK 3.7
 BK 5
 BK 7.5 (based on Rheinmetall's 7.5 cm Pak 40 with self-contained twelve-round magazine)

Rockets and Missiles
 Kramer Rk 344, air-to-air missile (liquid-fuel, rocket-powered)
 Henschel Hs 293, guided anti-ship, boost-glide missile
 R4M rocket
 Werfer-Granate 21 heavy-calibre air-to-air unguided rocket

Bombs

High explosive 
"Sprengcylindrisch"' (high-explosive)

 SC 50
 SC 250
 SC 500
 SC 1000 "Hermann"
 SC 1200
 SC 1800 "Satan"
 SC 2000
 SC 2500 "Max"
 SC 500J
 SB 1000
 SB 1800
 SB 2500

Anti-personnel 
"Splitterbomben-Dickwandig"' (Shrapnel)
 SD 1
 SD 1 FRZ
 SD 2
 SD 4 HL
 SD 4/HL RS
 SD 9/HL
 SD 10 A
 SD 10 FRZ
 SD 10 C
 SD 15
 SBe 50
 SD 50
 SD 70
 SBe 250
 SD 250
 SD 500
 SD 1400 "Esau"
 SD 1700 "Sigismund"
 SD 500A
 SD 500E

Armour-piercing 
 SC 10
 SC 10 DW
"Panzersprengbombe-Cylindrisch" (Armor-piercing bombs)
 PC 500* 'Pauline'
PC 500 RS
 PC 1000* 'Pol'
PC 1000 RS
 PC 1400 'Fritz' (starting point for the Fritz X gravity precision-guided munition)
 PC 1600
PC 1800 RS 'Panther'
PD 500
PD 1000

Cluster bombs 
 AB 23
 AB 250-2
AB 250-3
 AB 500-1
 AB 500-1B
 AB 500-3A
 AB 70-D1
 BDC 10

Prototype only
 the Düsenkanone 88 rotary-magazine heavy calibre cannon, meant to largely be recoilless
 Henschel Hs 298, air-to-air missile (rocket-powered)
Mauser MG 213
MK 112
 MK 115
MK 214A cannon
 SG 116 (Link is to german wikipedia page)
 Ruhrstahl X-4
 Jagdfaust

See also
 List of weapons of World War II Japanese aircraft
 Schräge Musik

References

External links

Weapons